Hubošovce is a village and municipality in Sabinov District in the Prešov Region of north-eastern Slovakia.

History
In historical records the village was first mentioned in 1435.

Geography
The municipality lies at an altitude of 370 metres and covers an area of 5.821 km2. It has a population of about 420 people.

Genealogical resources

The records for genealogical research are available at the state archive "Statny Archiv in Presov, Slovakia"

 Roman Catholic church records (births/marriages/deaths): 1829-1900 (parish B)
 Greek Catholic church records (births/marriages/deaths): 1861-1895 (parish B)

See also
 List of municipalities and towns in Slovakia

External links
https://web.archive.org/web/20070513023228/http://www.statistics.sk/mosmis/eng/run.html
Surnames of living people in Hubosovce

Villages and municipalities in Sabinov District
Šariš